The Malawi squeaker (Synodontis njassae) is a species of upside-down catfish endemic to Lake Malawi.  This species grows to a length of  TL.  This species is a minor component of local commercial fisheries and can also be found in the aquarium trade.

See also
List of freshwater aquarium fish species

References

External links 

Synodontis
Freshwater fish of Africa
Fish of Malawi
Fish of Mozambique
Fish of Tanzania
Fish described in 1908
Taxonomy articles created by Polbot
Fish of Lake Malawi